Laura Jane Waters  is a British physician, genitourinary consultant at the National Health Service (NHS) Mortimer Market Centre in London. She is chair of the British HIV Association (BHIVA) and advises the NHS on HIV treatment. Waters is a regular contributor to Boyz magazine, and throughout the COVID-19 pandemic provided regular advice to HIV-positive people.

Early life and education 
Waters was born in Crawley. She grew up in Dorking, and attended The Ashcombe School. Waters studied medicine at Charing Cross & Westminster  Medical School (CXWMS), which is now a college of Imperial College London. She completed her specialist training in genitourinary medicine in 2007. Her doctoral research involved ways to switch and simplify antiviral drugs. This included analysis the impact of the switch from efavirenz, an antiviral that is regularly used for antiviral therapy, to etravirine or maraviroc. After completing her doctorate Waters worked in clinical trials at Chelsea and Westminster Hospital and the Royal Sussex County Hospital, Brighton.

Research and career 
Waters is an HIV Consultant in the Central and North West London NHS Foundation Trust, where she works as a consultant physician in sexual health and HIV based at the Mortimer Market Centre . She leads several antiretroviral clinical trials, including studying the impact of antiviral drugs on body weight.

In 2019 Waters was elected Chair of the British HIV Association (BHIVA). She is a Fellow of the Board of the British Association of Sexual Health & HIV (BASHH). In this capacity, Waters as informed guidelines on the treatment of HIV-positive people. Waters works with the JUSTRI (The Training and Resource Initiative), a non-profit organisation that to improve responses to HIV. As part of this partnership, Waters provides training to medical students around the world.

During the COVID-19 pandemic Waters worked to provide guidance for people living with HIV (PLWH). She provided advice through her column in Boyz magazine and on the BHIVA website. Waters worked with BASHH to produce a contingency programme to maintain sexual health during the SARS-CoV-2 lockdown. As many genitourinary and reproductive health doctors were moved to the frontline, Waters was concerned about the disruption to sexual health during the pandemic. The BHIVA and BASHH recommended that the government introduce digitised sexual health advice, provide free, secure access to emergency contraceptives as well as removing all barriers to care. In April 2020, Waters criticised the Government of the United Kingdom's decision to send a text message to HIV-positive people encouraging them to stay at home because of risk to coronavirus disease, as there was no evidence that people with well controlled HIV needed to shield. In May 2020, Waters, the BHIVA and the European AIDS Clinical Society released a statement that combined multiple clinical studies to evaluate the risk of HIV-positive people to become infected with coronavirus disease, and said that were was no additional risk for people living with HIV.

Selected publications

Awards and honours
Waters is a Fellow of the Royal College of Physicians (FRCP).

References 

Living people
Year of birth missing (living people)
Fellows of the Royal College of Physicians
Alumni of Imperial College London
21st-century British medical doctors